An antae temple, also a distyle in antis temple, is a special name given to a type of ancient Greek or Roman temple that has side walls that extend to form a porch at the front or rear (or both) and terminated in structural pillars that were called the antae. If columns were placed in advance of the walls or antae, the temple was termed prostyle and if columns surrounded the temple it was termed peripteral.

See also
Anta capital 
Ancient Greek architecture

References

External links
The Roman Temples of Lebanon by George Taylor on discoverlebanon.com

Ancient Greek architecture
Architectural elements
Greek temples
Ancient Roman temples